Ida is the name of several rural localities in Russia:
Ida, Irkutsk Oblast, a settlement in Bokhansky District of Irkutsk Oblast
Ida, Vologda Oblast, a settlement in Idsky Selsoviet of Gryazovetsky District of Vologda Oblast

See also
Ida (disambiguation)